A community is a social unit that shares common values, or a group of interacting living organisms sharing an environment.

Community or Communities may also refer to:

Places
 Community (administrative division), a level of government structure found in many countries
 Community (Armenia)
 Community (China)
 Community (Greece)
 Community (Wales)

Art, entertainment, and media
 Communities (magazine)
 "Community" (Fear Itself episode)
 Community (TV series), an American television sitcom
 Community: A NewOrderOnline Tribute, an album

Other uses
 Community (ecology), a collection of populations of different species
 Plant community
 Community (trade union)
 Community structure, a concept in graph theory
 European Community, the first of the former pillars of the European Union
 Intentional community

See also

 List of community topics
 Sense of community
 Virtual community (disambiguation)